Mr. Suave: Hoy! Hoy! Hoy! Hoy! Hoy! Hoy! is a 2003 Filipino comedy film co-written and directed by Joyce E. Bernal starring Vhong Navarro (his first movie lead star) and Angelica Jones. The film was released on November 19, 2003.

Plot
Rico Suave (Vhong Navarro) is the ultimate ladies' man. In the bayside market where he works, he is constantly grilled by his four quirky friends (collectively known as the F-Poor) for "Suave" tips. Soon they find out that Rico has a problem: when he gets intimate with a girl, his entire body freezes. Rico is miserable. To help their friend, the F-Poor enlist the services of Venus Marte (Angelica Jones), a sexy con artist. Convinced that Rico is a potential goldmine to exploit, Venus agrees to take on the job. Sparks fly as Venus tries to snare Rico. But, when she finds herself genuinely falling for him, she is caught in a dilemma. Will there be a way out of this rut for Venus? Can Rico regain his old charm as Mr. Suave?

Cast

Main cast
Vhong Navarro as Rico Suave
Angelica Jones as Venus Marte

Supporting cast
Isko Salvador as Mr. Tea
Ketchup Eusebio as Mr. Roboto
Juddha Paolo as Mr. Clean
Julius Empoy Marquez as Mr. Takatak
Long Mejia as Doc Martin
Val Sotto as Dad
Ces Quesada as Mom
Tuesday Vargas as Stella
Mahal
Dagul

References

External links

2003 films
2003 comedy films
Films directed by Joyce Bernal
Philippine comedy films
Star Cinema films
2000s Tagalog-language films
2000s English-language films